Ordinary Seaman Anton Olsen (July 10, 1873 – June 23, 1924) was a United States Navy quartermaster who received the Medal of Honor.

Medal of Honor recipients
Olsen died at Metropolitan Hospital in Brooklyn on June 23, 1924. He is buried in New York City in Cypress Hills National Cemetery, Section 2, Grave No. 9158.
 Rank and organization: Ordinary Seaman, U.S. Navy. *Born: 26 April 1867, in Norway. *Accredited to: Massachusetts. G.O. No.: 529, 2 November 1899.

Citation:

On board the  during the operation of cutting the cable leading from Cienfuegos, Cuba, 11 May 1898. Facing the heavy fire of the enemy, Olsen displayed extraordinary bravery and coolness throughout this period.

See also

 List of Medal of Honor recipients for the Spanish–American War

References

External links
 

United States Navy Medal of Honor recipients
United States Navy sailors
American military personnel of the Spanish–American War
1873 births
1924 deaths
Norwegian emigrants to the United States
Burials at Cypress Hills National Cemetery
Spanish–American War recipients of the Medal of Honor
Norwegian-born Medal of Honor recipients
Military personnel from Massachusetts